The Village Priest may refer to:
 The Village Priest (1927 film), a Spanish silent drama film
 The Village Priest (1949 film), a Canadian drama film